Badamloq (also Romanized as Bādāmloq and Bādāmlūq) is a village in Zavarom Rural District, in the Central District of Shirvan County, North Khorasan Province, Iran. At the 2006 census, its population was 262, in 69 families.

References 

Populated places in Shirvan County